Sivan Rahav-Meir (Hebrew: סיון רהב מאיר; born July 2, 1981) is an Israeli journalist, news reporter, and TV and radio anchor.

Biography
Sivan Rahav was born in Ramat Hasharon to Aryeh and Ronit. When she was six, the family moved to Herzliya and she began writing in the children's magazines "Chupar" and "Pashosh". Identified as a gifted child at age eight, she studied at the School for Gifted Children – Shmuel HaNagid in Herzliya and then in the Ramot program for gifted children at the Rothberg High School.
Rahav-Meir served in the Galei Zahal army radio as the correspondent for welfare and absorption, legal affairs and religious affairs. Rahav was brought up secular, and became Orthodox as a teenager.

In 2003, she married Yedidya Meir, a columnist and radio presenter. Rahav-Meir lives in Jerusalem with her husband and five children.

Journalism and media career
Rahav-Meir was a presenter on Israeli Educational Television, including the children's programs "Banana Boom", co-presented with Michael HaNegbi, "Zoombit", a computer affairs program as well as a youth reporter for the "Kulanu" and "Rosh #1" magazines. She interviewed Prime Minister Yitzhak Rabin and Foreign Minister Shimon Peres, and took part in the Dan Shilon Live program and in Dudu Topaz's entertainment show.

From 2009, she presents a weekly radio program on Galei Zahal with her husband Yedidya on Fridays at noon.

Awards and recognition
In 2017, Rahav - Meir was chosen by Globes magazine as the most popular female media personality in Israel, and by the Liberal magazine as one of the 50 most influential people in Israel. In 2019, Rahav-Meir was appointed the World Mizrachi Shlicha to North America, where she lectured in various Jewish communities.

See also
Women in Israel

References

External links
 Sivan Rahav-Meir's official website
 Avital Chizhik-Goldschmidt, Part News Anchor, Part Rebbetzin: Meet Israel’s Favorite Newswoman, The Forward, 18 September 2017
 Lahav Harkov, FACEBOOK FOR RASHI, TWITTER FOR MAIMONIDES, Jerusalem Post, 9 November 2017
 Jew of the Week: Sivan Rahav-Meir
 Prof. Livia Bitton-Jackson, Sivan Rahav Meir: The Rebbetzin Journalist, 15 December 2017
 Elliot Resnick, Broadcasting Torah: An Interview With Israeli Journalist Sivan Rahav-Meir, 29 November 2017

Living people
Israeli journalists
Israeli television presenters
Israeli radio presenters
Israeli radio journalists
Israeli television journalists
Israeli women radio presenters
Israeli women television presenters
Israeli television talk show hosts
Year of birth missing (living people)